Love's Welcome at Bolsover (alternative archaic spelling, Balsover) is the final masque composed by Ben Jonson. It was performed on 30 July 1634, three years before the poet's death, and published in 1641.

The masque was not produced by the Stuart Court in one of the royal palaces around London, as many of Jonson's notable early masques were. Rather it was staged by William Cavendish, 1st Duke of Newcastle (at the time, he was the Earl of Newcastle) at Bolsover Castle in Derbyshire, in honor of King Charles I and Queen Henrietta Maria. Newcastle had put on a Jonson masque for his royal visitors at Welbeck in Nottinghamshire the year before: The King's Entertainment at Welbeck, performed on 21 May 1633. It was such a success that the King requested another on his 1634 royal progress. The Duke spent between £14,000 and £15,000 on staging the Bolsover masque and providing for his royal guests and their attendants, which was more than double the £4,000 to £5,000 he'd spent for the Welbeck entertainment the previous year. (The Masque of Beauty, one of Jonson's early Court masques, has cost £4,000 to stage in 1608, and was considered exorbitantly expensive at the time.)

In Love's Welcome, Jonson continued the mockery of Inigo Jones that he'd practiced for two decades, starting Bartholomew Fair (1614) and continuing through The Masque of Augurs (1622), Neptune's Triumph for the Return of Albion (1624), The Staple of News (1626), and A Tale of a Tub (1633). In this masque, Jones is "Colonel Iniquo Vitruvius."

The masque was staged in what was called the "little castle" at Bolsover, a then-recent (Jacobean) construction. The pillared hall there was furnished with five brilliantly colored paintings on the theme of The Senses; Jonson alludes to the paintings in his text. The show was described by local witnesses as "stupendous," more than adequate to establish Newcastle's reputation as the greatest "prince...in all the northern quarter" of the kingdom. Perhaps the most visually striking element in the masque lay in the two Cupids, Eros (Love) and Anteros (Love Returned), who descended "from the clouds" bearing fronds of palms.

The masque was published in 1641 in the second folio collection of Jonson's works, and was thereafter included in his canon, although it does not appear in Stephen Orgel's "Complete Masques of Ben Jonson". A manuscript text of the masque is also extant, in the collection of Newcastle manuscripts.

Notes

References
 Kozuka, Takashi, and J. R. Mulryne, eds. Shakespeare, Marlowe, Jonson: New Directions in Biography. London, Ashgate, 2006.
 Orgel, Stephen, ed. The Complete Masques of Ben Jonson. New Haven, Yale University Press, 1969.
 Perry, Henry Ten Eck. The First Duchess of Newcastle and Her Husband as Figures in Literary History. Boston, Ginn and Co., 1918.

External links
 Bolsover Castle.
 Bolsover Castle.

Masques by Ben Jonson
English Renaissance plays
1634 plays
Bolsover
Charles I of England
Henrietta Maria